Alexander of Jerusalem (died 251 AD) was a third century bishop who is venerated as a martyr and saint by the Eastern Orthodox Church, Oriental Orthodox churches, and the Roman Catholic Church.  He died during the persecution of Emperor Decius.

Life
Alexander was originally from Cappadocia and became Cappadocia's first bishop.  Afterwards he was associated as coadjutor with the Bishop of Jerusalem, Narcissus, who was, at that time, very old. Alexander had been imprisoned for his faith in the time of Roman Emperor Alexander Severus. After his release, he came to Jerusalem, where the aged Bishop Narcissus prevailed on Alexander to remain and assist him in the government of that see. 

It was Alexander who permitted Origen, despite being a layman, to speak in the churches. For this concession he was taken to task, but he defended himself by examples of other permissions of the same kind given even to Origen himself elsewhere, although then quite young. Alban Butler says that they had studied together in the great Christian school of Alexandria. Alexander ordained him a priest.

Alexander is praised for the library he built at Jerusalem. Though at his time Jerusalem was officially known as Aelia Capitolina, the name used by the Roman authorities since the city was rebuilt by the Emperor Hadrian, Christian tradition persisted in using the original name.

Persecution and death
Finally, in spite of his years, he, with several other bishops, was carried off a prisoner to Caesarea, and as the historians say, "The glory of his white hairs and great sanctity formed a double crown for him in captivity".  His vita states that he suffered many tortures, but survived them all. When the wild beasts were brought to devour him, some licked his feet, and others their impress on the sand of the arena.

Veneration
His feast is kept by the Roman Catholic Church on March 18, by the Eastern Orthodox Churches on May 16/29 and December 12/25.

Writings
Eusebius has preserved fragments of a letter written by him to the Antinoïtes; of another to the Antiochenes; of a third to Origen; and of another, written in conjunction with Theoctistus of Caesarea, to Demetrius of Alexandria..

References

External links

Patron Saints Index: Saint Alexander of Jerusalem
 

2nd-century deaths
Year of birth unknown
251 deaths
3rd-century bishops of Jerusalem
Doctors of the Church
Saints from the Holy Land
Cappadocia (Roman province)
People who died in prison custody
3rd-century Christian martyrs